They Came from the Sea is an Australian novel by E. V. Timms. It was the eighth in his Great South Land Saga of novels.

References

External links
'They Came from the Sea at AustLit

1955 Australian novels
Angus & Robertson books